Helena is the capital city of the U.S. state of Montana and the seat of Lewis and Clark County.

Helena was founded as a gold camp during the Montana gold rush, and established on October 30, 1864. Due to the gold rush, Helena would become a wealthy city, with approximately 50 millionaires inhabiting the area by 1888. The concentration of wealth contributed to the city's prominent, elaborate Victorian architecture.

At the 2020 census Helena's population was 32,091, making it the fifth least populous state capital in the United States and the sixth most populous city in Montana. It is the principal city of the Helena Micropolitan Statistical Area, which includes all of Lewis and Clark and Jefferson counties; its population is 83,058 according to the 2020 Census.

The local daily newspaper is the Independent Record. The city is served by Helena Regional Airport (HLN).

History
The Helena area was long inhabited by various indigenous peoples. Evidence from the McHaffie and Indian Creek sites on opposite sides of the Elkhorn Mountains southeast of the Helena Valley show that people of the Folsom culture lived in the area more than 10,000 years ago. Before the introduction of the horse 300 years ago, and since, other native peoples, including the Salish and the Blackfeet, visited the area seasonally on their nomadic rounds.

Early European settlement and gold rush

By the early 1800s, people of European descent from the United States and British Canada began arriving to work the streams of the Missouri River watershed looking for fur-bearing animals such as the beaver, undoubtedly bringing them through the area now known as the Helena Valley.

Gold strikes in Idaho Territory in the early 1860s attracted many migrants who initiated major gold rushes at Grasshopper Creek (Bannack) and Alder Gulch (Virginia City) in 1862 and 1863 respectively. So many people came that the federal government created a new territory called Montana in May 1864. The miners prospected far and wide for new placer gold discoveries. On July 14, 1864, the discovery of gold by a prospecting party known as the "Four Georgians" in a gulch off the Prickly Pear Creek led to the founding of a mining camp along a small creek in the area they called "Last Chance Gulch".

By fall, the population had grown to over 200, and some thought the name "Last Chance" too crass. On October 30, 1864, a group of at least seven self-appointed men met to name the town, authorize the layout of the streets, and elect commissioners.  The first suggestion was "Tomah," a word the committee thought had connections to the local Indian people. Other nominations included Pumpkinville and Squashtown (as the meeting was held the day before Halloween). Other suggestions were to name the community after various Minnesota towns, such as Winona and Rochester, as a number of settlers had come from Minnesota.  Finally, a Scotsman, John Summerville, proposed Helena, which he pronounced  , in honor of Helena Township, Scott County, Minnesota. This immediately caused an uproar from the former Confederates in the room, who insisted upon the pronunciation  , after Helena, Arkansas, a town on the Mississippi River. While the name "Helena" won, the pronunciation varied until approximately 1882 when the   pronunciation became dominant. Later tales of the naming of Helena claimed the name came from the island of St. Helena, where Napoleon was exiled, or was that of a miner's sweetheart.

Helena was surveyed by Captain John Wood in 1865 for the first time. The original streets of Helena followed the paths of miners, thus making the city blocks of Early Helena various sizes and shapes.

In 1870, Henry D. Washburn, having been appointed Surveyor General of Montana in 1869, organized the Washburn-Langford-Doane Expedition in Helena to explore the regions that would become Yellowstone National Park. Mount Washburn, within the park, is named for him. Members of the expedition included Helena residents:

 Truman C. Everts, former U.S. Assessor for the Montana Territory
 Cornelius Hedges, U.S. Attorney of the Montana Territory
 Samuel T. Hauser, president of the First National Bank, Helena, Montana; later a Governor of the Montana Territory
 Warren C. Gillette, Helena merchant
 Walter Trumbull, son of U.S. Senator Lyman Trumbull (Illinois)
 Nathaniel P. Langford, then former U.S. Collector of Internal Revenue for Montana Territory. Langford helped Washburn organize the expedition and later helped publicize the remarkable Yellowstone region. In May 1872 after the park was established, Langford was appointed by the Department of Interior as its first superintendent.

Wealth boom

By 1888 about 50 millionaires lived in Helena, more per capita than in any city in the world. They had made their fortunes from gold. It is estimated about $3.6 billion in today's money was extracted from Helena during this period of time. The Last Chance Placer is one of the most famous placer deposits in the western United States. Most of the production occurred before 1868. Much of the placer is now under Helena's streets and buildings.

This large concentration of wealth was the basis of developing fine residences and ambitious architecture in the city; its Victorian neighborhoods reflect the gold years. The numerous miners also attracted the development of a thriving red light district. Among the well-known local madams was Josephine "Chicago Joe" Airey, who built a thriving business empire between 1874 and 1893, becoming one of Helena's largest and most influential landowners. Helena's brothels were a successful part of the local business community well into the 20th century, ending with the 1973 death of Helena's last madam, "Big Dorothy" Baker.

Helena's official symbol is a drawing of "The Guardian of the Gulch", a wooden fire watch tower built in 1886. It still stands on Tower Hill overlooking the downtown district. The tower, built in 1874, replaced a series of observation buildings, the original being built in response to a series of devastating fires that swept through the early mining camp. On August 2, 2016, an arson attack severely damaged the tower and it was deemed structurally unstable. The tower is to be demolished but will be rebuilt using the same methods as in its original construction.

In 1889, railroad magnate Charles Arthur Broadwater opened his Hotel Broadwater and Natatorium west of Helena. The Natatorium was home to the world's first indoor swimming pool. Damaged in the 1935 Helena earthquake, it closed in 1941. The property's many buildings were demolished in 1976. Today, the Broadwater Fitness Center stands just west of the Hotel & Natatorium's original location, complete with an outdoor pool heated by natural spring water running underneath it.

Helena has been the capital of Montana Territory since 1875 and the state of Montana since 1889. Referendums were held in 1892 and 1894 to determine the state's capital; the result was to keep the capitol in Helena. In 1902, the Montana State Capitol was completed. Until the 1900 census, Helena was the most populous city in the state. That year it was surpassed by Butte (with a population of 30,470), where mining industry was developing.

Among the settlers the city's prosperity attracted were Blacks fleeing racism in the South. Many found work in the mines or on the railroads and established a middle class that supported Black-owned businesses, Black churches, Black newspapers and a Black literary society. A Black police officer patrolled the town's wealthiest (white) neighborhood. But in the later 1900s new discriminatory laws, such as a ban on mixed marriages and the establishment of many sundown towns, along with the attendant racist attitudes that led to them drove many Blacks out not just Helena but the state, to the point that the city's Black population today is a small fraction of what it was in the early 20th century.

In 1916, the United Daughters of the Confederacy commissioned the construction of the Confederate Memorial Fountain in Hill Park. It was the only Confederate memorial in the Northwestern United States. The fountain was removed on August 18, 2017, after the Helena City Commission deemed it a threat to public safety following a white nationalist rally in Charlottesville, Virginia.

1980s–present

The Cathedral of Saint Helena and the Helena Civic Center are two of Helena's many significant historic buildings.

Many working Helenans (approx. 18%) work for agencies of the state government. When in Helena, most people visit the local walking mall. It was completed in the early 1980s after Urban Renewal and the Model Cities Program in the early 1970s had removed many historic buildings from the downtown district. During the next decade, a three-block shopping district was renovated that followed the original Last Chance Gulch. A small artificial stream runs along most of the walking mall to represent the underground springs that originally flowed above ground in parts of the Gulch.

The Archie Bray Foundation, an internationally renowned ceramics center founded in 1952, is just northwest of Helena, near Spring Meadow Lake.

A significant train wreck occurred on February 2, 1989, in which a 48-car runaway freight train slammed into a parked train near Carroll College, setting off an explosion that blasted out windows up to three miles away, causing most of the city to lose power and forcing some residents to evacuate in subzero weather.

With the mountains, Helena has much outdoor recreation, including hunting and fishing. Great Divide Ski Area is northwest of town near the ghost town of Marysville. Helena is also known for its mountain biking. It was officially designated as an International Mountain Bicycling Association bronze level Ride Center on October 23, 2013.

Helena High School and Capital High School are public high schools in Helena School District No. 1.

In 2017, Helena voters elected as mayor former Liberian refugee Wilmot Collins, who was widely reported to be Helena's first black mayor. The Independent Record reported contested research indicating that in the early 1870s one E. T. Johnson, listed in the city directory as a black barber from Washington D.C., had been elected mayor, before Helena became an incorporated town.

Geography

Helena is located at  (46.595805, −112.027031), at an altitude of 4,058 feet (1,237 m).

Surrounding features include the Continental Divide, Mount Helena City Park, Spring Meadow Lake State Park, Lake Helena, Helena National Forest, the Big Belt Mountains, the Gates of the Mountains Wilderness, Sleeping Giant Wilderness Study Area, Bob Marshall Wilderness, Scapegoat Wilderness, the Missouri River, Canyon Ferry Lake, Holter Lake, Hauser Lake, and the Elkhorn Mountains.

Climate
Helena has a semi-arid climate (Köppen BSk), with long, cold and moderately snowy winters, hot and dry summers, and short springs and autumns in between. Snowfall has been observed in every month but July, but is usually absent from May to September, and normally accumulates in only light amounts. Winters have periods of moderation, partly due to warming influence from chinooks. Precipitation mostly falls in the spring and is generally sparse, averaging only  annually.

Demographics

2010 census
As of the census of 2010, there were 28,190 people, 12,780 households, and 6,691 families residing in the city. The racial makeup of the city was 93.3% White, 0.4% African American, 2.3% Native American, 0.7% Asian, 0.1% Pacific Islander, 0.6% from other races, and 2.6% from two or more races. Hispanic or Latino of any race were 2.8% of the population.

There were 12,780 households, of which 24.3% had children under the age of 18 living with them, 38.2% were married couples living together, 10.6% had a female householder with no husband present, 3.6% had a male householder with no wife present, and 47.6% were non-families. 39.8% of all households were made up of individuals, and 13.5% had someone living alone who was 65 years of age or older. The average household size was 2.07 and the average family size was 2.77.

The median age in the city was 40.3 years. 20.1% of residents were under the age of 18; 11.6% were between the ages of 18 and 24; 23.3% were from 25 to 44; 29.5% were from 45 to 64; and 15.6% were 65 years of age or older. The gender makeup of the city was 48.0% male and 52.0% female.

2000 census

As of the census of 2000, there were 25,780 people, 11,541 households, and 6,474 families residing in the city. The population density was 1,840.7 people per square mile (710.5/km2). There were 12,133 housing units at an average density of 866.3 per square mile (334.4/km2). The ethnic makeup of the city is 94.8% White, 0.2% African American, 2.1% Native American, 0.8% Asian, 0.1% Pacific Islander, 0.4% from other races, and 1.7% from two or more races. 1.7% of the population were Hispanic or Latino of any race.

There were 11,541 households, out of which 27.1% had children under the age of 18 living with them, 42.5% were married couples living together, 10.4% had a female householder with no husband present, and 43.9% were non-families. 37.5% of all households were made up of individuals, and 11.3% had someone living alone who was 65 years of age or older. The average household size was 2.14 and the average family size was 2.83.

In the city, the population was spread out, with 22.4% under the age of 18, 11.1% from 18 to 24, 26.6% from 25 to 44, 26.0% from 45 to 64, and 13.9% who were 65 years of age or older. The median age was 39 years. For every 100 females, there were 91.0 males. For every 100 females age 18 and over, there were 87.6 males.

The median income for a household in the city was $34,416, and the median income for a family was $50,018. Males had a median income of $34,357 versus $25,821 for females. The per capita income for the city was $20,020. About 9.3% of families and 14.5% of the population were below the poverty line, including 16.4% of those under age 18 and 8.3% of those age 65 or over.

Economy
Helena has a long record of economic stability with its history as being the state capital and being founded in an area rich in silver and lead deposits. However, this situation has resulted in a slow growing economy. Its status as capital makes it a major hub of activity at the county, state, and federal level. According to the Helena Area Chamber of Commerce, the capital's median household income is $50,889, and its unemployment rate stood at 3.8% in 2013, about 1.2% lower than the rest of the state. Education is a major employer, with two high schools and accompanying elementary and middle schools for K–12 students as well as Helena College. Major private employers within the city of Helena include Carroll College and the medical community.

Helena's economy is also bolstered by Fort William Henry Harrison, the training facility for the Montana National Guard, located just outside the city. Fort Harrison is also home to Fort Harrison VA Medical Center, where many Helena-area residents work.

Education

Higher education

 Carroll College, a Catholic liberal arts college which opened in 1909, enrolls 1,500 students.
 Helena College University of Montana, a two-year affiliate campus of The University of Montana, provides transfer, career, and technical education for more than 1,600 students.  It opened in 1939.

Primary and secondary education
List of schools in Helena, Montana

Library
Helena has a public library, a branch of the Lewis & Clark Library.

Media

Helena's Designated Market Area is 205th in size, as defined by Nielsen Media Research, and is the fifth smallest media market in the nation.

Notable people

See also
USS Helena, 5 ships

Gallery: modern day

Gallery: historical

References

Further reading
 Wood, Anthony. "After the West Was Won How African American Buffalo Soldiers Invigorated the Helena Community in Early Twentieth-Century Montana." Montana 66.3 (2016): 36–50.

External links

 
 Vintage images on HelenaHistory.org
 

 
Cities in Montana
Cities in Lewis and Clark County, Montana
County seats in Montana
Populated places established in 1864
Helena, Montana micropolitan area
Mining communities in Montana
Gold mines in the United States
1864 establishments in Montana Territory